Sorocea is a Neotropical genus of woody plants in the family Moraceae. Its distribution ranges from Chiapas to southern Brazil. It is placed within the tribe Moreae, and is closely related to the monotypic Bagassa.

Species List 
According to Kew, there are currently 22 accepted species:

 Sorocea affinis Hemsl.
 Sorocea angustifolia Al.Santos & Romaniuc
 Sorocea bonplandii (Baill.) W.C.Burger, Lanj. & de Boer
 Sorocea briquetii J.F.Macbr.
 Sorocea carautana M.D.M.Vianna, Carrijo & Romaniuc
 Sorocea duckei W.C.Burger
 Sorocea ganevii R.M.Castro
 Sorocea guilleminiana Gaudich.
 Sorocea hilarii Gaudich.
 Sorocea jaramilloi C.C.Berg
 Sorocea jureiana Romaniuc
 Sorocea klotzschiana Baill.
 Sorocea longipedicellata A.F.P.Machado, M.D.M.Vianna & Romaniuc
 Sorocea muriculata Miq.
 Sorocea pubivena Hemsl.
 Sorocea racemosa Gaudich.
 Sorocea ruminata C.C.Berg
 Sorocea sarcocarpa Lanj. & Wess.Boer
 Sorocea sprucei (Baill.) J.F.Macbr.
 Sorocea steinbachii C.C.Berg
 Sorocea subumbellata (C.C.Berg) Cornejo
 Sorocea trophoides W.C.Burger

References

 
Moraceae genera
Taxonomy articles created by Polbot